The Benguela long-billed lark (Certhilauda benguelensis), also known as the Benguela lark or Benguela longbill is a species of lark in the family Alaudidae. It is found in south-western Africa. Its natural habitat is subtropical or tropical dry lowland grassland.

Taxonomy and systematics
The Benguela long-billed lark was originally placed in the genus Alaemon. Confusingly, the terms Damara longbill and Damaraland long-billed lark are used for both the Karoo long-billed lark and a subspecies of the Benguela long-billed lark. Clements lumps this bird with the Karoo long-billed lark.

Subspecies 
Two subspecies are recognized: 

 C. b. benguelensis - (Sharpe, 1904): Found in south-western Angola and north-western Namibia
 Damara longbill or Damaraland long-billed lark (C. b. kaokoensis) - Bradfield, 1944: Found in north-western and west-central Namibia

References

 BirdLife International 2004.  Certhilauda benguelensis.   2006 IUCN Red List of Threatened Species. Downloaded on 24 July 2007.

Benguela long-billed lark
Fauna of Angola
Benguela long-billed lark
Taxonomy articles created by Polbot